James Alexander Stevens was an American football coach.  He coached at Prairie View A&M University, where he was credited for building the program's "dynasty" in its "glory years."  He later went on to coach at North Carolina College at Durham—now known as North Carolina Central University.

Early life and education
A native of St. Louis, Missouri, Stevens earned a Bachelor of Science degree at Kansas State Teachers College—now known as Emporia State University and a Master of Science at the University of Southern California (USC).

Coaching career

Prairie View A&M
Stevens was the seventh head football coach at Prairie View A&M University in Prairie View, Texas, holding that position for three seasons, from 1949 until 1951.  His record at Prairie View was 24–7.

North Carolina College
In 1965, Stevens was named the tenth head football coach at North Carolina College at Durham—now known as North Carolina Central University. He held that position for three seasons, from 1965 to 1967, compiling a record of 10–15–2.

Personal life
Stevens was married to Jocelyn Cain (died 1980) and had two sons.

Head coaching record

References

Year of birth missing
Year of death missing
Bishop Tigers athletic directors
Bishop Tigers football coaches
North Carolina A&T Aggies football coaches
North Carolina Central Eagles football coaches
Prairie View A&M Panthers and Lady Panthers athletic directors
Prairie View A&M Panthers football coaches
Emporia State University alumni
University of Southern California alumni
Sportspeople from St. Louis
African-American coaches of American football
African-American college athletic directors in the United States
20th-century African-American sportspeople